The 109th district of the Texas House of Representatives consists of portions of southern Dallas County. This includes Cedar Hill, Lancaster, Hutchins, Wilmer, Seagoville, southern parts of the city of Dallas, and half of DeSoto. The current Representative is Carl Sherman, who has represented the district since 2019.

The district contains a portion of major highway I-35.

References 

109